The 2022 Hackney London Borough Council election took place on 5 May 2022. All 57 members of Hackney London Borough Council were up for election. The elections took place alongside the election for the mayor of Hackney, local elections in the other London boroughs, and elections to local authorities across the United Kingdom.

The Labour Party retained overall control of the council. It won 50 of the 57 seats, losing two seats to the Green Party. The Conservative Party held the five seats that they had had before the election, remaining the official opposition.

Background

History 

The thirty-two London boroughs were established in 1965 by the London Government Act 1963. They are the principal authorities in Greater London and have responsibilities including education, housing, planning, highways, social services, libraries, recreation, waste, environmental health and revenue collection. Some of the powers are shared with the Greater London Authority, which also manages passenger transport, police and fire.

Since its formation, Hackney has usually been under Labour control except for a period from 1968 to 1971 when it was under Conservative control and from 1998 to 2002 when it was under no overall control. Councillors have mostly been elected from the Labour Party, Conservative Party and Liberal Democrats, with some Green Party councillors being elected in 1998 and 2006. In the most recent election in 2018, the Liberal Democrats lost their three seats in the Cazenove ward with Labour winning 52 seats with 63.0% of the vote across the borough and the Conservatives winning the remaining 5 seats with 11.1% of the vote across the borough. The Green Party won 16.9% of the vote across the borough without winning any seats, performing best in the Dalston and Hackney Downs wards. The Liberal Democrats won 8.6% of the vote without winning any seats, performing best in Cazenove ward. The council is run under a mayoral system, so its leader is the directly elected mayor of Hackney. The incumbent mayor of Hackney was Labour's Philip Glanville, who had held that role since a 2016 by-election.

In November 2021, the local Conservative Party in Hackney selected Oliver Hall as their candidate for Mayor. At nineteen years old, he is thought to have been the youngest ever major-party candidate for a directly elected mayoralty in England and Wales.

Council term 
A Labour councillor for Victoria ward, Alex Kuye, resigned in September 2018 for health reasons. A by-election to replace him was held in October 2018, which was won by the Labour candidate Penny Wrout with 58% of the vote against a swing to the Liberal Democrats. Wrout taught journalism at the University of Essex. In November 2019, a Labour councillor for Clissold ward, Ned Hercock, resigned for personal reasons. A by-election was held on 12 December 2019 on the same date as the 2019 general election, which was won by the Labour candidate Kofo David. David was an activist training to be a barrister. His selection as the Labour candidate was criticised by opposing candidates who pointed to his unsuccessful court action against a former colleague who had accused him of sexual harassment and bullying.

Feryal Clark, a Labour councillor for Hoxton East and Shoreditch, resigned after being elected as Member of Parliament (MP) for Enfield North. A Labour councillor for King's Park, Tom Rahilly, resigned in March 2020 due to taking a politically restricted job. A Conservative councillor for Stamford Hill West, Aron Klein, resigned in July 2020 due to ill health. Jon Burke, a Labour councillor for Woodberry Down, resigned in January 2021 due to plans to move out of London. Due to the COVID-19 pandemic, all four by-elections were not held until May 2021 alongside the 2021 London mayoral election and London Assembly election. The candidates for the incumbent party won in all four seats. The Labour candidate Anya Sizer won in Hoxton East and Shoreditch, with the Green Party coming second. The Labour candidate Lynne Troughton won in King's Park, with the Greens again coming second. The Conservative candidate Stephen Lisser won the Stamford Hill West by-election, with Labour coming a closer second. The Labour candidate Sarah Young won the Woodberry Down by-election with the Green Party coming in second place.

Unlike most London boroughs, Hackney kept its existing ward boundaries, as they were last reviewed in 2013.

Electoral process 
Hackney, like other London borough councils, elects all of its councillors at once every four years. The previous election took place in 2018. The election took place by multi-member first-past-the-post voting, with each ward being represented by two or three councillors. Electors had as many votes as there were councillors to be elected in their ward, with the top two or three being elected.

All registered electors (British, Irish, Commonwealth and European Union citizens) living in London aged 18 or over were entitled to vote in the election. People who lived at two addresses in different councils, such as university students with different term-time and holiday addresses, were entitled to be registered for and vote in elections in both local authorities. Voting in-person at polling stations took place from 7:00 to 22:00 on election day, and voters were able to apply for postal votes or proxy votes in advance of the election.

Campaign

Mayoral election 
The Conservatives selected the nineteen-year-old law student, Oliver Hall, as their mayoral candidate. Hall said he would stop any new Low Traffic Neighbourhood schemes and consult on removing existing ones. He also promised to build more affordable housing. Gwenton Swoley, an anti-gang activist, stood as an independent candidate under the slogan "Hackney People Before Profit". He said that the proceeds of the crime fund should be spent on "talking therapy and drop-in services" to "help people whose mental health has deteriorated during successive lockdowns". He said he would work to stop children from being excluded from school, and provide mentoring to young people after they are arrested, to prevent them from getting involved in gangs and criminal activity.

Previous council composition

Results summary

|}

Ward results

Asterisks (*) denote sitting councillors

Brownswood

Cazenove

Clissold

Dalston

De Beauvoir

Hackney Central

Hackney Downs

Hackney Wick

Haggerston

Homerton

Hoxton East & Shoreditch

Hoxton West

King's Park

Lea Bridge

London Fields

Shacklewell

Springfield

Stamford Hill West

Stoke Newington

Victoria

Woodberry Down

By-elections

De Beauvoir

References 

Council elections in the London Borough of Hackney
Hackney